Bourekas or burekas are a popular baked pastry in Sephardic Jewish cuisine and Israeli cuisine. A variation of the burek, a popular pastry throughout southern Europe, northern Africa and the Middle East, Israeli bourekas are made in a wide variety of shapes and a vast selection of fillings, and are typically made with either puff pastry, filo dough, or brik pastry, depending on the origin of the baker.

Etymology
As knowledge of Ladino is lost among the younger generation of Sephardic Jews, Judeo-Spanish has become a "language of food". Food names have been described as "the last Judeo-Spanish remains" of the cultural memory of Ottoman-Sephardic heritage.  The word boureka (or borekita) is a Judeo-Spanish loanword from the Turkish börek. Spanish does not have the front rounded Turkish ö sound, so the word becomes boreka. 

As one Turkish food writer put it, "Ladino is the borekitas of the granmama".

In Judeo-Spanish boreka originally referred to empanada style pastries, while the traditional Ottoman börek were called bulema.

Overview

Bourekas have been called "the Israeli equivalent of Jewish-American bagel and cream cheese" and are served for almost any occasion, from a meeting of Israeli soldiers to a Shabbat kiddush. Gil Marks has said:
In Modern Israel, borekas…follows only falafel in popularity as a street snack food and rank among the favorite home treats for the Sabbath or a simple weekday nosh.

Bourekas can be found everywhere in Israel. They are also baked in dedicated boureka bakeries specializing in baking bourekas.

Bourekas are often made out of puff pastry filled with various fillings. Among the popular fillings are feta cheese, kashkaval cheese, minced meat, mashed potato, spinach and cheese, eggplant, and mushrooms.

History

Early history
The Sephardic Jews of Spain were making empanadas before the expulsion from Spain.

In some towns of Emilia-Romagna such as the former city-states Ferrara and Modena, the Jewish community used to consume a half-moon shaped sweet pastry called burriche or burricche. This dish, perhaps inspired by Ottoman cuisine, was part of the cuisine eaten by the Jewish communities that lived in Italy, and is possibly linguistically related to bourekas.

1478 to 1800s
The Sephardi Jews who were expelled from Spain sought refuge in the Ottoman Empire.

Most of these places were under the control of the Ottoman Empire. 
The Sephardic Jews created a new dish which adapted börek to their kosher dietary laws, and combined it with their traditional empanadas to create bourekas.

1800s to 1948

During the first aliyah Sephardic Jews made aliyah and moved to Palestine. They brought with them their traditional cuisine, and this included bourekas. They began to open up bakeries serving these pastries.

1948 to present

The State of Israel declared independence in 1948. With the massive influx of Sephardi Jews, they too brought with them their cuisine and this included bourekas. Sephardic and Mizrahi cuisine became the dominant cuisine in Israel, due to the majority of Israelis belonging to these two groups, and due to the local climate.

Bourekas quickly became a very popular food across Israel, and their popularity spread to Israelis of all ethnicities. Yemenite and other Jews adapted bourekas to their own cuisines. Turkish Jews, Greek Jews and Bulgarian Jews, among others, opened eateries serving their own style and variations of bourekas.

Shapes

Israeli Bourekas come in a variety of shapes, which are indicative of their fillings. The laws of kashrut require avoiding eating dairy pastries together with ones containing meat, so conventional, distinctive shapes are used to indicate different types of fillings. Cheese Bourekas come in right angled and isosceles triangles, and have two different sizes. Potato-filled Bourekas come in a certain box shape. Pizza filled Bourekas resemble a co-centric tower, while spinach filled bourekas resemble a pastry knot. There are also the so-called "Turkish Bourekas" which form rounded equilateral triangles, and are filled with various fillings, whose type can usually be determined by the addition on their outside.

Shape regulation

In June 2013, the Chief Rabbinate of Israel passed a law regulating the shape of bourekas (and also rugelach and croissants) sold by kosher-certified bakers in Israel. According to the law, all bourekas made with puff pastry and containing dairy products had to be shaped into triangles, while parve (nondairy) bourekas made with puff pastry had to be made in round or square shapes. The Chief Rabbinate also implemented different regulations regarding the shape of bourekas made with phyllo dough, these bourekas must be made in triangular-shapes if parve (non-dairy), and "snake-shaped" if made with dairy.

Preparation

Traditionally making bourekas was a very time-consuming process, taking many hours on end until the bourekas were finished. Bourekas are traditionally made with freshly made enriched dough, either similar to puff pastry or phyllo depending on the origin of the baker, although brik pastry, malawach dough, puff pastry, croissant dough, or babka dough are also sometimes used. To make homemade filo for bourekas, a simple flour and water dough is rolled out like thin flatbreads. They are brushed with oil then layered until the dough is very elastic and can be hand pulled until it is translucent. It is a laborious process and storebought frozen puff pastry or phyllo dough is more commonly used by home chefs today.

The dough is then rolled out, and it is cut into various shapes. Any variety of fillings are placed into the center of each piece of dough, the edges of which are sealed with egg wash or water. Each boureka is then brushed with an egg wash and topped with seeds or seasoning, and is baked.

Bourekas are also very commonly sold frozen in grocery and convenience stores in Israel by brands such as Ta'amti and Tnuva in flavors such as cheese, spinach and cheese, potato, and pizza.

Toppings

Bourekas are traditionally topped with any multitude of seeds. Sesame seeds are most common, however depending on the filling, poppy seeds, black sesame seeds, everything bagel seasoning, nigella seeds, or za'atar may be used as a topping.

Sides and condiments

Savory bourekas are traditionally paired with hard boiled eggs or haminados, a hot sauce such as skhug or harif, grated tomato, and sometimes tahini sauce, as well as olives, Israeli pickles, other pickled vegetables, and sometimes a salad as well. The use of skhug and grated tomato as an accompaniment to bourekas originated within the Yemenite Jewish community of Israel, who serve many of their traditional breads such as malawach in a similar manner.

In popular culture

Bourekas film

 	
"Bourekas film" (Hebrew: סרטי בורקס ) are a type of Israeli movie from the 1970s dealing with certain cultural aspects of Israelis, especially lower-class Mizrahi Israelis and their conflicts with the Ashkenazi establishment.  The term is a calque on Spaghetti Western.

See also
Rugelach
Empanada
Knish- a similar Ashkenazi Jewish pastry
Samosa
Spanikopita
Tyropita

References

Sephardi Jewish cuisine
Israeli cuisine
Savoury pies
Jewish cuisine

fr:Börek
he:בורקס
sl:Burek